Heinrich Hübsch (9 February 1795 – 3 April 1863) was a German architect.  After studies in Heidelberg (1813–15) and at Friedrich Weinbrenner's school of architecture in Karlsruhe (1815–17) he traveled extensively in Greece and Italy (1817–24).  In 1831 he was appointed Oberbaurat (inspector of buildings) at Karlsruhe.  He designed many churches and other public buildings, mainly in the Grand Duchy of Baden, and is also known for his writings.

In his book In welchem Style sollen wir bauen? (In which style should we build?, 1828) he distanced himself from Weinbrenner's neoclassical style. Die altchristlichen Kirchen (Karlsruhe, 1862) is a work on basilican architecture, published also in French as Monuments de l'architecture chrétienne.

Hübsch is credited with creating the Rundbogenstil architectural style.

Publications
(s:de:Heinrich Hübsch)

Buildings

 Polytechnical School, main building, Karlsruhe, 1833–1835
 Staatliche Kunsthalle Karlsruhe, 1836–1846
 Kassel Synagogue, 1839
 Trinkhalle, Baden-Baden, 1839–1842
 Bruchsal penitentiary, 1841–1848
 Karlsruhe Botanical Garden, plant houses, 1853–1857
 Speyer Cathedral westwork, 1854–1858
 Kath. Kirche St. Cyriakus, Beiertheim-Bulach  1835-1837

External links 
 Heinrich Hübsch at the SAAI

References

German architecture writers
1795 births
1863 deaths
19th-century German architects
Architecture educators
Architectural theoreticians
German non-fiction writers
People from Weinheim
People from the Grand Duchy of Baden
Heidelberg University alumni
Academic staff of the Karlsruhe Institute of Technology
German male non-fiction writers